Krasnoyarsk-East is a goods station on Trans-Siberian Railway in Krasnoyarsk, Russia.

References

Railway stations in Krasnoyarsk Krai
Krasnoyarsk